Daniel MacArthur Gade (born February 7, 1975) is an American disability and veteran services activist, political candidate, professor, and researcher. He became an amputee in 2005 while serving as a company commander in Ramadi, Iraq. Gade retired from the United States Army as a lieutenant colonel in 2017. Gade was the Republican nominee for the 2020 election to represent Virginia in the United States Senate losing to incumbent Democrat Mark Warner. He currently serves as the Commissioner of the Virginia Department of Veterans Services.

Early life and education
Gade was born and raised in Minot, North Dakota. In 1997, he graduated from the United States Military Academy (West Point) with a Bachelor of Science in Environmental Science. Gade graduated with a Master of Public Administration and a Doctor of Philosophy in public administration and public policy from the University of Georgia in 2007 and 2011, respectively.

Career

Gade was wounded in action twice and decorated for valor while serving as a tank company commander in Iraq. After Gade's second injury, his entire right leg was amputated. He was awarded the Bronze Star and the Legion of Merit.
 
Gade has advocated for veteran disability policies that encourage self-reliance and vocational rehabilitation. He has authored a couple of scholarly articles in that field, most notably in Health Economics and the Journal of Public Administration Research and Theory. In 2012, Gade began serving as an advisor at the Philanthropy Roundtable for its veterans work. In 2013, he published an article in National Affairs about disability benefits and their failure to achieve positive outcomes for disabled veterans. In 2013, Gade authored an article in The Wall Street Journal arguing that disability claims in the United States Department of Veterans Affairs backlog were due in large part to the agency's expansive definition of "disability". Daniel Huang and Gade co-authored a policy review book, Wounding Warriors: How Bad Policy Is Making Veterans Sicker and Poorer, which questions the efficacy of present disability services for veterans.

Gade served in the administration of President George W. Bush. Gade returned to West Point in 2011, and he retired from the Army in 2017. In 2015, Gade was appointed to the National Council on Disability. In 2017, Gade was nominated to be a member of the Equal Employment Opportunity Commission, but later withdrew from consideration citing the "toxic political climate in Washington."

Since 2019, Gade has worked as a Professor of Practice at American University's School of Public Affairs.

Governor-elect Glenn Youngkin nominated Gade to lead the Commonwealth of Virginia Department of Veterans Services in January 2022. He was confirmed to it.

2020 U.S. Senate campaign

Gade was the Republican nominee for the 2020 election to represent Virginia in the United States Senate. He faced adjunct professor and public school teacher Alissa Baldwin and defense contractor and retired Army intelligence officer Thomas Speciale in the Republican primary. Gade became the nominee after garnering 67% of the vote while Baldwin and Speciale received 18% and 15%, respectively. The seat is held by Democrat Mark Warner. Warner was re-elected with 56% of the vote; Gade received 44%.

Personal life

Gade lives in Mount Vernon, Virginia, with his wife, Wendy, and their three children. He became the paralympic world champion at the 2010 Ironman 70.3 in Clearwater, Florida. President George W. Bush described cycling with Gade as "unbelievable", since he "rode with one leg, navigating some really tough trails". Gade is a competitive cyclist.

References

External links

United States Army personnel of the Iraq War
American University
Candidates in the 2020 United States Senate elections
George W. Bush administration personnel
Living people
Military personnel from North Dakota
People from Minot, North Dakota
United States Army colonels
United States Military Academy alumni
University of Georgia alumni
Virginia Republicans
Obama administration personnel
1975 births